Chilton Independent School District is a public school district based in the community of Chilton, Texas (USA).

In addition to Chilton, the district serves a portion of Golinda.

Chilton ISD has one school that serves students in grades pre-kindergarten through 12.

Chilton Independent School District, or more commonly referred to as Chilton High School, prides itself on its success in various regions of extra-curricular activities, most notably football, in which Chilton won their second 1A state football championship in 2006. Chilton also has won the state championship in golf the past three season, due to the success from junior Gabby Dominguez. Brenton Hall, a senior at the time, reached the 1A State Finals in tennis in 2008.

In 2009, the school district was rated "recognized" by the Texas Education Agency.

References

External links
Chilton ISD

School districts in Falls County, Texas